An Initial exchange offering (IEO) is the cryptocurrency exchange equivalent to a stock launch or Initial public offering (IPO). An IEO is the process of digital asset (e.g. coins or tokens) procurement through an established exchange for the purpose of raising capital for start-up companies. Exchanges act as a middleman between investors and the startup, profiting from fees generated by services rendered during the due diligence process and funding phase. IEO's and initial coin offerings (ICO) share similar characteristics with, however, an IEO can be seen as an evolution from the ICO due to legal influence and an increase in financial regulations within the cryptocurrency market.

History 
The first use of an IEO by a major exchange was in January 2019, with the launch of Binance's platform Binance Launchpad. The first use of the platform was with BitTorrent Tokens (BTT) which raised $7.1 million in less than 18 minutes. Since 2019, Binance has launched 63 projects with a total of $133 million raised. Binance's venture into the IEO field further invited more exchanges to offer similar services.

Advantages 
IEO's allow startup companies to participate in large scale fundraising through a trustworthy intermediary who will verify transactions and manage the funds generate during the capital generation process. Unlike in an initial coin offering (ICO) the startup does not need to manage and conduct the fundraising process. The duties are handled by the exchange who can execute transactions, manage currency wallets and the transferring of funds from different blockchains to customer wallets. 

 IEO's allow for companies and startups to raise capital in through the sale of tokens or coin on a cryptocurrency exchange. This reduces investor risk by the due diligence and vetting completed by the exchange.
 The use of Utility Tokens allow for investors and business to mutual benefit due to the additional access given by holders of a given business utility token. 
 IEO's create a safer investment ecosystem by providing access to new investment opportunities on a trusted platform.
 IEO's use the exchanges brand to further promote new projects through their platforms users giving the startup a larger invest pool to raise capital.

Disadvantages 

IEO's allow for startups to participate in large scale investments opportunities with the introduction of their business to a large investment ecosystem. IEO's are a vastly more secure method of investment procurement for startups, but it comes at the cost of fees paid to the exchange for their time analyzing the business and a predetermined percentage of the capital raised.

 Fees rendered during research stage of IEO development and percentage of total revenue earned.
 Exchanges vary in security level and overall quality, thus some IEO's may be less effective
 The risk of pump and dump schemes is still present in IEO's

Procedure 
An IEO which is successful has to follow specific guidelines during the due diligence stage of IEO selection. Since exchanges are using their company brand to promote and invite investors to purchase a startups token or utility coin they insure the project and company is reliable and trustworthy. Platforms that are to promote new startups analyze and vet the businesses white paper, team, business plan, tech and assess the tokenomics of the business. Exchanges vet and analyze business to insure the business plans and projects are up to the values of the exchange. This saves the exchange from damaging their reputation and insures the business is following the global legal requirements such as Anti-Money Laundering Act for cryptocurrency sales.ref></ref>

Regulation 
Following the major rise of IEO's in 2019 many regulatory agencys have not created legal restrictions. The Securities and Exchange Committee commented on IEO's stating:"Be cautious if considering an investment in an IEO. Claims of new technologies and financial products, such as those associated with digital asset offerings, and claims that IEOs are vetted by trading platforms, can be used improperly to entice investors with the false promise of high returns in a new investment space. As described below, IEOs may be conducted in violation of the federal securities laws and lack many of the investor protections of registered and exempt securities offerings." As of 2022, regulation in major industries have been limited and only a few nations have implemented some level of restriction. Registered national security exchanges and automated trading systems (ATSs) are governed by federal laws and regulations aimed at protecting investors and preventing fraudulent and manipulative trading practices. Several online trading platforms mislead investors into believing that they are registered or meet any of the regulatory requirements for a national securities exchange or an ATS, and so do not provide investors with the investor protections that such exchanges or ATSs provide. By failing to comply with federal securities laws, an IEO and/or trading platform may be operating unlawfully and may not be offering the investors and market protections and remedies these laws are designed to provide. Consider carefully whether the trading platform and the company involved in the IEO have complied with federal securities laws.

Red flags 
The following are signs of fraud or illegal behaviour, as stated by SEC:

 In the absence of discussion or reference to the U.S. federal securities laws, the IEO and online trading platform should be considered as a red flag.
 Any offering that declares it will avoid the federal securities laws of the United States by occurring on an overseas trading platform, but nonetheless allows US investors to invest, should be regarded as a red flag.
 IEOs that claim to be vetted by the trading platforms are a red flag. A security offered in the IEO may violate U.S federal securities laws regardless of whether the trading platform vetted the offering.

Further, the SEC cautioned that there is no such thing as an "SEC-approved IEO."

References

Further reading 
 

Cryptocurrencies